"There's a Small Hotel" is a 1936 song composed by Richard Rodgers, with lyrics by Lorenz Hart. Originally written for but dropped from the musical Billy Rose's Jumbo (1935), it was used in On Your Toes (1936), where it was introduced by Ray Bolger and Doris Carson, and repeated by Jack Whiting and Vera Zorina in the London West End production that opened on 5 February 1937, at the Palace Theatre.

Betty Garrett sang it in the 1948 film Words and Music, and it was interpolated in the film version of Pal Joey (1957) with a Frank Sinatra-Nelson Riddle collaboration.

Background
According to the biography of Lorenz Hart by Frederick Nolan (Lorenz Hart - A Poet on Broadway, 1994; Oxford University Press), the song was inspired by a visit that Richard Rodgers made to the Stockton Inn, in Stockton, New Jersey. Hart reputedly found the melody insistently cloying and often ad-libbed raunchy parody verses, much to Rodgers' chagrin.

Another claimant to be the inspiration for the song is the Belmond El Encanto in Santa Barbara County, California.  Renovations to the hotel in the 1950s replaced the wishing well, mentioned in the song, by a floral fountain.

Notable recordings
 Hal Kemp And His Orchestra: "There's A Small Hotel"/"It's Got To Be Love" (Brunswick 7634, 1936) – Shellac 10", 78 RPM
 Jack Whiting: "There's A Small Hotel"/"On Your Toes" (Columbia CA 16274, 1937) – Shellac 10", 78 RPM
 Josephine Baker: "Plus Tard"/"C'est Un Nid Charmant" (Columbia 291179, 1937) – Shellac 10", 78 RPM; a version of the song with French lyrics, as "C'est Un Nid Charmant"
 Stan Getz: Stan Getz Quartets (Prestige PRLP 7002, 1950)
 Hank Mobley: Newark 1953 (Uptown, 1953)
 Ginny Gibson: "The Song That Broke My Heart"/"There's a Small Hotel" (M-G-M 11814, 1954) – 45 rpm
 Bobby Van & Kay Coulter: On Your Toes (1954) – (1954 revival)
 Hank Jones: The Trio (Savoy, 1955)
 Chet Baker: Chet Baker in Europe (Pacific Jazz PJ 1218, 1956)
 Ella Fitzgerald: Ella Fitzgerald Sings the Rodgers & Hart Songbook (Verve, 1956)
 Frank Sinatra: Soundtrack of the film Pal Joey (Capitol, 1957) – the song was re-released on the compilation album Frank Sinatra Sings the Select Rodgers & Hart (Capitol, 1995)
 Johnny Smith: The Johnny Smith Foursome, Volume II (Royal Roost Records, 1957)
 Billy Taylor: The New Billy Taylor Trio (ABC-Paramount S-226, 1958)
 Dorothy Ashby: Hip Harp (Prestige, 1958)
 Petula Clark: Petula Clark in Hollywood (Pye NPL 18039, 1959)
 Della Reese: Della Della Cha-Cha-Cha (RCA, 1960)
 Billy Eckstine: Broadway, Bongos and Mr. B (Mercury SR 60637, 1961) – with the Hal Mooney Orchestra        
 The Hi-Lo's: This Time It's Love (Columbia CL 1723/CS 8523, 1962)
 Billy Paul: Going East (Philadelphia International, 1971)
 Robert Clary: Robert Clary Sings Rodgers, Hart & Mercer (Original Cast 9770, 1997)
 June Christy: Friendly Session, Vol. 3 (Jasmine JASCD-369, 2000)
 Jane Monheit: Home (EmArcy, 2010)

References

Songs with music by Richard Rodgers
Songs with lyrics by Lorenz Hart
1936 songs
1930s jazz standards
Songs about hotels and motels
Songs from Pal Joey (film)
Songs from Rodgers and Hart musicals

Jazz standards
Jazz compositions in G major